Duggie Du Preez (18 March 1927 – 13 October 2000) was a South African boxer. He competed in the men's welterweight event at the 1948 Summer Olympics.

References

1927 births
2000 deaths
Welterweight boxers
South African male boxers
Olympic boxers of South Africa
Boxers at the 1948 Summer Olympics
Place of birth missing